Humphrey Michael Cobbold (born Nairobi, Kenya 1964) is the current Chief Executive Officer of Pure Gym which is the UK’s largest Gym operator.  He joined the business in 2015 when there were 84 gyms, growing the business to over 200 facilities in 2018. He oversaw the sale of the business for the founder (Peter Roberts) and investors from CCMP to Leonard Green & Partners in November 2017 for over £600m.

He is the former Chief Executive Officer of Wiggle Ltd - a UK-based online retailer of cycling and triathlon-related products. He is a former chairman of Fish4, a British recruitment website, as well as the Director of Strategic Development and Executive Committee member of Trinity Mirror.

Before joining Fish4 and Trinity Mirror, he was a partner and the co-head of the UK media practice for the global management consulting firm McKinsey & Company. He graduated from the University of Cambridge and holds an MBA from INSEAD.

Before she went into politics, Cobbold was taught in secondary school by prominent UK politician Edwina Curry.

Leaving Wiggle
In September 2009, Humphrey Cobbold began his position as the CEO of Wiggle Ltd., a Portsmouth-based online retailer.  He headed the bicycle online retailer during some trying times, including during the period when Bridgepoint was in the process of acquiring Wiggle Ltd. In late 2013, Cobbold departed from Wiggle as its CEO and in September of that year, his successor would be Stefan Barden. While Cobbold captained Wiggle Ltd. the company saw its annual sales revenues increase from 33 million pounds to a little over 140 million pounds; Cobbold described managing the company while it was experiencing speedy and high growth as "trying to ride a tiger".

Upon leaving Wiggle Ltd. as its CEO, Cobbold stated:

“I have had the privilege to work with a truly fabulous group of colleagues and business partners over the last four years. The time is now right for someone else to lead the peloton and take Wiggle forward to future success.”

He has since been linked to a bid to buy the internet retailer sofa.com.

PureGym 
Since 2013 Cobbold has been serving as the CEO of PureGym, a network of 264 gyms with more than 1.1 million members. In 2019 PureGym acquired Fitness World.

References 

Fat Face owner buys Wiggle; Carlton Reid; Bike Biz; December 7, 2011

1964 births
Living people
McKinsey & Company people